Taylor Alison Swift (born December 13, 1989) is an American singer-songwriter. Her genre-spanning discography, songwriting and artistic reinventions have received critical praise and wide media coverage. Born in West Reading, Pennsylvania, Swift moved to Nashville at age 14 to become a country artist. She signed a songwriting deal with Sony/ATV Music Publishing in 2004 and a recording contract with Big Machine Records in 2005. Her 2006 self-titled debut album made her the first female country singer to write a U.S. platinum-certified album.

Swift's next albums, Fearless (2008) and Speak Now (2010), explored country pop. The former's "Love Story" and "You Belong with Me" were the first country songs to top the U.S. pop and all-genre airplay charts, respectively. She experimented with rock and electronic styles on Red (2012), which featured her first Billboard Hot 100 number-one song, "We Are Never Ever Getting Back Together", and eschewed her country image in her synth-pop album, 1989 (2014), supported by chart-topping songs "Shake It Off", "Blank Space", and "Bad Blood". Media scrutiny inspired the urban-flavored Reputation (2017) and its number-one single "Look What You Made Me Do".

Exiting Big Machine, Swift signed with Republic Records in 2018 and released her seventh studio album, Lover (2019), followed by the autobiographical documentary Miss Americana (2020). She ventured into indie folk and alternative rock in her 2020 albums Folklore and Evermore, whose singles "Cardigan" and "Willow" topped the Hot 100. Swift began re-recording her first six albums after a dispute over their masters, re-releasing two in 2021—Fearless (Taylor's Version) and Red (Taylor's Version). The latter's "All Too Well (10 Minute Version)" became the longest song to top the Hot 100. Her 2022 album Midnights and single "Anti-Hero" broke all-time streaming records. Swift has directed music videos and films, such as All Too Well: The Short Film (2021), and played supporting roles in others.

Having sold over 200 million records globally, Swift is one of the best-selling musicians in history. She is the most streamed woman on Spotify, and the only act to have five albums open with over one million copies sold in the US. Among her accolades are 12 Grammy Awards, including three Album of the Year wins; an Emmy Award; 40 American Music Awards; 29 Billboard Music Awards; three IFPI Global Recording Artist of the Year awards; and 92 Guinness World Records. Swift has been featured in rankings such as Rolling Stone 100 Greatest Songwriters of All Time, Billboard Greatest of All Time Artists, the Time 100 and Forbes Celebrity 100. Honored with titles such as Artist of the Decade and Woman of the Decade, Swift is an advocate for artists' rights and women's empowerment. Her music is credited with influencing a generation of singer-songwriters.

Life and career

1989–2003: childhood and education 

Taylor Alison Swift was born on December 13, 1989, in West Reading, Pennsylvania. Her father, Scott Kingsley Swift, is a former stockbroker for Merrill Lynch and her mother, Andrea Gardner Swift (née Finlay), is a former homemaker who previously worked as a mutual fund marketing executive. Her younger brother, Austin, is an actor. She was named after singer-songwriter James Taylor, and has Scottish and German heritage. Her maternal grandmother, Marjorie Finlay, was an opera singer. Swift spent her early years on a Christmas tree farm that her father had purchased from one of his clients. Swift identifies as a Christian. She attended preschool and kindergarten at the Alvernia Montessori School, run by the Bernadine Franciscan sisters, before transferring to The Wyndcroft School. The family moved to a rented house in the suburban town of Wyomissing, Pennsylvania, where Swift attended Wyomissing Area Junior/Senior High School. She spent her summers at the beach in Stone Harbor, New Jersey, and performed in a local coffee shop.

At age nine, Swift became interested in musical theater and performed in four Berks Youth Theatre Academy productions. She also traveled regularly to New York City for vocal and acting lessons. Swift later shifted her focus toward country music, inspired by Shania Twain's songs, which made her "want to just run around the block four times and daydream about everything." She spent weekends performing at local festivals and events. After watching a documentary about Faith Hill, Swift felt sure she needed to move to Nashville, Tennessee, to pursue a career in music. She traveled with her mother at age eleven to visit Nashville record labels and submitted demo tapes of Dolly Parton and The Chicks karaoke covers. She was rejected, however, because "everyone in that town wanted to do what I wanted to do. So, I kept thinking to myself, I need to figure out a way to be different."

When Swift was around 12 years old, computer repairman and local musician Ronnie Cremer taught her to play guitar. "Kiss Me" by Sixpence None the Richer was the first song Swift learned to play on the guitar. Cremer helped with her first efforts as a songwriter, leading her to write "Lucky You". In 2003, Swift and her parents started working with New York-based talent manager Dan Dymtrow. With his help, Swift modeled for Abercrombie & Fitch as part of their "Rising Stars" campaign, had an original song included on a Maybelline compilation CD, and attended meetings with major record labels. After performing original songs at an RCA Records showcase, Swift, then 13 years old, was given an artist development deal and began making frequent trips to Nashville with her mother. To help Swift enter into the country music scene, her father transferred to Merrill Lynch's Nashville office when she was 14 years old, and the family relocated to Hendersonville, Tennessee. Swift initially attended Hendersonville High School before transferring to the Aaron Academy after two years, which better suited her touring schedule through homeschooling. She graduated one year early.

2004–2008: career beginnings and first album 
In Nashville, Swift worked with experienced Music Row songwriters such as Troy Verges, Brett Beavers, Brett James, Mac McAnally, and the Warren Brothers and formed a lasting working relationship with Liz Rose. They began meeting for two-hour writing sessions every Tuesday afternoon after school. Rose thought the sessions were "some of the easiest I've ever done. Basically, I was just her editor. She'd write about what happened in school that day. She had such a clear vision of what she was trying to say. And she'd come in with the most incredible hooks." Swift became the youngest artist signed by the Sony/ATV Tree publishing house, but left the Sony-owned RCA Records at the age of 14 due to the label's lack of care and them "cut[ting] other people's stuff". She was also concerned that development deals may shelve artists, and recalled: "I genuinely felt that I was running out of time. I wanted to capture these years of my life on an album while they still represented what I was going through."

At an industry showcase at Nashville's Bluebird Cafe in 2005, Swift caught the attention of Scott Borchetta, a DreamWorks Records executive who was preparing to form an independent record label, Big Machine Records. She had first met Borchetta in 2004. She was one of Big Machine's first signings, and her father purchased a three-percent stake in the company for an estimated $120,000. She began working on her eponymous debut album with producer Nathan Chapman, with whom she felt she had the right "chemistry". Swift wrote three of the album's songs alone, and co-wrote the remaining eight with Rose, Robert Ellis Orrall, Brian Maher, and Angelo Petraglia. Taylor Swift was released on October 24, 2006. Country Weekly critic Chris Neal deemed Swift better than previous aspiring teenage country singers because of her "honesty, intelligence and idealism". The album peaked at number five on the U.S. Billboard 200, where it spent 157 weeks—the longest stay on the chart by any release in the U.S. in the 2000s decade. It made Swift the first female country-music artist to write or co-write every track on a U.S. platinum-certified album.

Big Machine Records was still in its infancy during the June 2006 release of the lead single, "Tim McGraw", which Swift and her mother helped promote by sending copies of the CD single to country radio stations. As there was not enough furniture at the label yet, they would sit on the floor to do so. She spent much of 2006 promoting Taylor Swift with a radio tour, television appearances; she opened for Rascal Flatts on select dates during their 2006 tour, as a replacement for Eric Church. Borchetta said that although record industry peers initially disapproved of his signing a 15-year-old singer-songwriter, Swift tapped into a previously unknown market—teenage girls who listen to country music. Following "Tim McGraw", four more singles were released throughout 2007 and 2008: "Teardrops on My Guitar", "Our Song", "Picture to Burn" and "Should've Said No". All appeared on Billboards Hot Country Songs, with "Our Song", and "Should've Said No" reaching number one. With "Our Song", Swift became the youngest person to single-handedly write and sing a number-one song on the chart. "Teardrops on My Guitar" reached number thirteen on the U.S. Billboard Hot 100. Swift also released two EPs, The Taylor Swift Holiday Collection in October 2007 and Beautiful Eyes in July 2008. She promoted her debut album extensively as the opening act for other country musicians' tours throughout 2006–2007, including George Strait, Brad Paisley, and Tim McGraw and Faith Hill.

Swift won multiple accolades for Taylor Swift. She was one of the recipients of the Nashville Songwriters Association's Songwriter/Artist of the Year in 2007, becoming the youngest person to be honored with the title. She also won the Country Music Association's Horizon Award for Best New Artist, the Academy of Country Music Awards' Top New Female Vocalist, and the American Music Awards' Favorite Country Female Artist honor. She was also nominated for Best New Artist at the 50th Annual Grammy Awards. In 2008, she opened for the Rascal Flatts again, and dated singer Joe Jonas for three months.

2008–2010: Fearless and acting debut 

Swift's second studio album, Fearless, was released on November 11, 2008, in North America, and in March 2009, in other markets. Critics lauded Swift's honest and vulnerable songwriting in contrast to other teenage singers. Five singles were released in 2008 through 2009: "Love Story", "White Horse", "You Belong with Me", "Fifteen", and "Fearless". "Love Story", the lead single, peaked at number four on the Billboard Hot 100 and number one in Australia. It was the first country song to top Billboard's Pop Songs chart. "You Belong with Me" was the album's highest-charting single on the Billboard Hot 100, peaking at number two, and was the first country song to top Billboard's all-genre Radio Songs chart. All five singles were Hot Country Songs top-10 entries, with "Love Story" and "You Belong with Me" topping the chart. Fearless became her first number-one album on the Billboard 200 and 2009's top-selling album in the U.S. The Fearless Tour, Swift's first headlining concert tour, grossed over $63 million. Journey to Fearless, a three-part documentary miniseries, aired on television and was later released on DVD and Blu-ray. Swift also performed as a supporting act for Keith Urban's Escape Together World Tour in 2009.

In 2009, the music video for "You Belong with Me" was named Best Female Video at the MTV Video Music Awards. Her acceptance speech was interrupted by rapper Kanye West, an incident that became the subject of controversy, widespread media attention, and many Internet memes. That year she won five American Music Awards, including Artist of the Year and Favorite Country Album. Billboard named her 2009's Artist of the Year. The album ranked number 99 on NPR's 2017 list of the 150 Greatest Albums Made By Women. She won Video of the Year and Female Video of the Year for "Love Story" at the 2009 CMT Music Awards, where she made a parody video of the song with rapper T-Pain called "Thug Story". At the 52nd Annual Grammy Awards, Fearless was named Album of the Year and Best Country Album, and "White Horse" won Best Country Song and Best Female Country Vocal Performance. Swift was the youngest artist to win Album of the Year. At the 2009 Country Music Association Awards, Swift won Album of the Year for Fearless and was named Entertainer of the Year, the youngest person to win the honor.

Swift featured on John Mayer's single "Half of My Heart" and Boys Like Girls' single "Two Is Better Than One", both of which she co-wrote. She co-wrote and recorded "Best Days of Your Life" with Kellie Pickler, and co-wrote two songs for the Hannah Montana: The Movie soundtrack—"You'll Always Find Your Way Back Home" and "Crazier". She contributed two songs to the Valentine's Day soundtrack, including the single "Today Was a Fairytale", which was her first number-one on the Canadian Hot 100, and peaked at number two on the Billboard Hot 100. While shooting her film debut Valentine's Day in October 2009, Swift dated co-star Taylor Lautner. In 2009, she made her television debut as a rebellious teenager in an CSI: Crime Scene Investigation episode. She hosted and performed as the musical guest on Saturday Night Live; she was the first host to write their own opening monologue.

2010–2014: Speak Now and Red 

In August 2010, Swift released "Mine", the lead single from her third studio album, Speak Now. It entered the Hot 100 at number three. Swift wrote the album alone and co-produced every track. Speak Now, released on October 25, 2010, debuted atop the Billboard 200 with first-week sales of one million copies. It became the fastest-selling digital album by a female artist, with 278,000 downloads in a week, earning Swift an entry in the 2010 Guinness World Records. Critics appreciated Swifts grown-up perspectives; Rob Sheffield of Rolling Stone wrote, "in a mere four years, the 20-year-old Nashville firecracker has put her name on three dozen or so of the smartest songs released by anyone in pop, rock or country." The songs "Mine", "Back to December", "Mean", "The Story of Us", "Sparks Fly", and "Ours" were released as singles, with the latter two reaching number one. "Back to December" and "Mean" peaked in the top ten in Canada. She briefly dated actor Jake Gyllenhaal in 2010.

At the 54th Annual Grammy Awards in 2012, Swift won Best Country Song and Best Country Solo Performance for "Mean", which she performed during the ceremony. Swift won other awards for Speak Now, including Songwriter/Artist of the Year by the Nashville Songwriters Association (2010 and 2011), Woman of the Year by Billboard (2011), and Entertainer of the Year by the Academy of Country Music (2011 and 2012) and the Country Music Association in 2011. At the American Music Awards of 2011, Swift won Artist of the Year and Favorite Country Album. Rolling Stone placed Speak Now at number 45 in its 2012 list of the "50 Best Female Albums of All Time", writing: "She might get played on the country station, but she's one of the few genuine rock stars we've got these days, with a flawless ear for what makes a song click."

The Speak Now World Tour ran from February 2011 to March 2012 and grossed over $123 million, followed up with its live album, Speak Now World Tour: Live. She contributed two original songs to The Hunger Games soundtrack album: "Safe & Sound", co-written and recorded with the Civil Wars and T-Bone Burnett, and "Eyes Open". "Safe & Sound" won the Grammy Award for Best Song Written for Visual Media and was nominated for the Golden Globe Award for Best Original Song. Swift featured on B.o.B's single "Both of Us", released in May 2012. Swift dated Conor Kennedy that year.

In August 2012, Swift released "We Are Never Ever Getting Back Together", the lead single from her fourth studio album, Red. It became her first number one in the U.S. and New Zealand, and reached the top slot on iTunes' digital song sales chart 50 minutes after its release, earning the Fastest Selling Single in Digital History Guinness World Record. Other singles released from the album include "Begin Again", "I Knew You Were Trouble", "22", "Everything Has Changed", "The Last Time", and "Red". "I Knew You Were Trouble" reached the top five on charts in Australia, Canada, Denmark, Ireland, New Zealand, the U.K. and the U.S. Three singles, "Begin Again", "22", and "Red", reached the top 20 in the U.S. Red was released on October 22, 2012. On Red, Swift worked with longtime collaborators Nathan Chapman and Liz Rose, as well as new producers such as Max Martin and Shellback. The album incorporated many pop and rock styles such as heartland rock, dubstep and dance-pop. Randall Roberts of Los Angeles Times said Swift "strives for something much more grand and accomplished" with Red. It debuted at number one on the Billboard 200 with first-week sales of 1.21 million copies, making Swift the first female to have two million-selling album openings—a Guinness World Records. Red was Swift's first number-one album in the U.K.

The Red Tour ran from March 2013 to June 2014 and grossed over $150 million, becoming the highest-grossing country tour when it completed. The album earned several accolades, including four nominations at the 56th Annual Grammy Awards (2014). Its single "I Knew You Were Trouble" won Best Female Video at the 2013 MTV Video Music Awards. Swift received American Music Awards for Best Female Country Artist in 2012, and Artist of the Year in 2013. She received the Nashville Songwriters Association's Songwriter/Artist Award for the fifth and sixth consecutive years in 2012 and 2013. Swift was honored by the Association with the Pinnacle Award, making her the second recipient of the accolade after Garth Brooks. During this time, she briefly dated English singer Harry Styles. 
 
In 2013, Swift recorded "Sweeter than Fiction", a song she wrote and produced with Jack Antonoff for the One Chance film soundtrack. The song received a Best Original Song nomination at the 71st Golden Globe Awards. She provided guest vocals for Tim McGraw's song "Highway Don't Care", which featured guitar work by Keith Urban. Swift performed "As Tears Go By" with the Rolling Stones in Chicago, Illinois as part of the band's 50 & Counting tour. She joined Florida Georgia Line on stage during their set at the 2013 Country Radio Seminar to sing "Cruise". Swift voiced Audrey in the animated film The Lorax (2012), made a cameo in the sitcom New Girl (2013), and had a supporting role in the dystopian drama film The Giver (2014).

2014–2018: 1989 and Reputation 

In March 2014, Swift began living in New York City. She worked on her fifth studio album, 1989, with producers Jack Antonoff, Max Martin, Shellback, Imogen Heap, Ryan Tedder, and Ali Payami. She promoted the album through various campaigns, including inviting fans, called "Swifties", to secret album-listening sessions for the first time. The album was released on October 27, 2014, and debuted atop the U.S. Billboard 200 with sales of 1.28 million copies in its first week. Its singles "Shake It Off", "Blank Space" and "Bad Blood" reached number one in Australia, Canada and the U.S., the first two making Swift the first woman to replace herself at the Hot 100 top spot; other singles include "Style", "Wildest Dreams", "Out of the Woods" and "New Romantics". The 1989 World Tour ran from May to December 2015 and was the highest-grossing tour of the year with $250 million in total revenue.

Prior to 1989s release, Swift stressed the importance of albums to artists and fans. In November 2014, she removed her entire catalog from Spotify, arguing that the streaming company's ad-supported, free service undermined the premium service, which provides higher royalties for songwriters. In a June 2015 open letter, Swift criticized Apple Music for not offering royalties to artists during the streaming service's free three-month trial period and stated that she would pull 1989 from the catalog. The following day, Apple Inc. announced that it would pay artists during the free trial period, and Swift agreed to let 1989 on the streaming service. Swift's intellectual property rights holding company, TAS Rights Management, filed for 73 trademarks related to Swift and the 1989 era memes. She then returned her entire catalog plus 1989 to Spotify, Amazon Music and Google Play and other digital streaming platforms in June 2017. Swift was named Billboards Woman of the Year in 2014, becoming the first artist to win the award twice. At the 2014 American Music Awards, Swift received the inaugural Dick Clark Award for Excellence. On her 25th birthday in 2014, the Grammy Museum at L.A. Live opened an exhibit in her honor in Los Angeles that ran until October 4, 2015, and broke museum attendance records. In 2015, Swift won the Brit Award for International Female Solo Artist. The video for "Bad Blood" won Video of the Year and Best Collaboration at the 2015 MTV Video Music Awards. Swift was one of eight artists to receive a 50th Anniversary Milestone Award at the 2015 Academy of Country Music Awards. At the 58th Grammy Awards in 2016, 1989 won Album of the Year and Best Pop Vocal Album, and "Bad Blood" won Best Music Video. Swift was the first woman and fifth act overall to win Album of the Year twice as a lead artist.

Swift dated Scottish DJ Calvin Harris from March 2015–June 2016. Prior to their breakup, they co-wrote the song "This Is What You Came For", which features vocals from Barbadian singer Rihanna; Swift was initially credited under the pseudonym Nils Sjöberg. After briefly dating English actor Tom Hiddleston, Swift began dating English actor Joe Alwyn in September 2016. She wrote the song "Better Man" for country band Little Big Town; it earned Swift an award for Song of the Year at the 51st CMA Awards. Swift and English singer Zayn Malik released a single together, "I Don't Wanna Live Forever", for the soundtrack of the film Fifty Shades Darker (2017). The song reached number two in the U.S. and won Best Collaboration at the 2017 MTV Video Music Awards. In August 2017, Swift successfully sued David Mueller, a former radio jockey for KYGO-FM. Four years earlier, Swift had informed Mueller's bosses that he had sexually assaulted her by groping her at an event. After being fired, Mueller accused Swift of lying and sued her for damages from his loss of employment. Shortly after, Swift counter-sued for sexual assault for nominal damages of only one dollar. The jury rejected Mueller's claims and ruled in favor of Swift.

After a one-year hiatus from public spotlight, Swift cleared her social media accounts and released "Look What You Made Me Do" as the lead single from her sixth album, Reputation. The single was Swift's first U.K. number-one single. It topped charts in Australia, Ireland, New Zealand, and the U.S. Reputation was released on November 10, 2017. It incorporated a heavy electropop sound, along with hip hop, R&B, and EDM influences. Reviewers praised Swift's mature artistry, but some denounced the themes of fame and gossip. The album debuted atop the Billboard 200 with first-week sales of 1.21 million copies. Swift became the first act to have four albums sell one million copies within one week in the U.S. The album topped the charts in the UK, Australia, and Canada, and had sold over 4.5 million copies worldwide as of 2018. It spawned three other international singles, including the U.S. top-five entry "...Ready for It?", and two U.S. top-20 singles—"End Game" (featuring Ed Sheeran and rapper Future) and "Delicate". Swift launched the short-lived The Swift Life mobile app for fans in late 2017. Reputation was nominated for Best Pop Vocal Album at the 61st Annual Grammy Awards in 2019. At the American Music Awards of 2018, Swift won four awards, including Artist of the Year and Favorite Pop/Rock Female Artist. After the 2018 AMAs, Swift garnered a total of 23 awards, becoming the most awarded female musician in AMA history, a record previously held by Whitney Houston. In April 2018, Swift featured on country duo Sugarland's "Babe". In support of Reputation, she embarked on her Reputation Stadium Tour, which ran from May to November 2018. In the U.S., the tour grossed $266.1 million in box office and sold over two million tickets, breaking many records, the most prominent being the highest-grossing North American concert tour in history. It grossed $345.7 million worldwide. It was followed up with an accompanying concert film on Netflix.

2018–2020: Lover, Folklore and Evermore 
Reputation was Swift's last album with Big Machine. In November 2018, she signed a new deal with the Universal Music Group; her subsequent releases were promoted by Republic Records. Swift said the contract included a provision for her to maintain ownership of her masters. In addition, in the event that Universal sold any part of its stake in Spotify, it agreed to distribute a non-recoupable portion of the proceeds among its artists. Vox called it a huge commitment from Universal, which was "far from assured" until Swift intervened.

Swift released her seventh studio album, Lover, on August 23, 2019. Besides Jack Antonoff, Swift worked with new producers Louis Bell, Frank Dukes, and Joel Little. Lover made Swift the first female artist to have a sixth consecutive album sell more than 500,000 copies in one week in the U.S. Critics commended the album's free-spirited mood and emotional intimacy. The lead single, "Me!", peaked at number two on the Hot 100. Other singles from Lover were the U.S. top-10 singles "You Need to Calm Down" and "Lover", and U.S. top-40 single "The Man". Lover was the world's best-selling album by a solo artist of 2019, selling 3.2 million copies. Lover and its singles earned nominations at the 62nd Annual Grammy Awards in 2020. At the 2019 MTV Video Music Awards, "Me!" won Best Visual Effects, and "You Need to Calm Down" won Video of the Year and Video for Good. Swift was the first female and second artist overall to win Video of the Year for a video that they directed.

While promoting Lover, Swift became embroiled in a public dispute with talent manager Scooter Braun and Big Machine over the purchase of the masters of her back catalog. Swift said she had been trying to buy the masters, but Big Machine only allowed her to do so if she exchanged one new album for each older one under another contract, which she refused to do. Swift began re-recording her back catalog in November 2020. Besides music, she played Bombalurina in the movie adaptation of Andrew Lloyd Webber's musical Cats (2019), for which she co-wrote and recorded the Golden Globe-nominated original song "Beautiful Ghosts". Critics panned the film but praised Swift's performance. The documentary Miss Americana, which chronicled parts of Swift's life and career, premiered at the 2020 Sundance Film Festival and was released on Netflix that January. Swift signed a global publishing deal with Universal Music Publishing Group in February 2020 after her 16-year-old contract with Sony/ATV expired.

Amidst the COVID-19 pandemic, Swift released two surprise albums: Folklore on July 24, and Evermore on December 11, 2020. Both explore indie folk and alternative rock with a more muted production compared to her previous upbeat pop songs. Swift wrote and recorded the albums with producers Jack Antonoff and Aaron Dessner from the National. Alwyn co-wrote and co-produced select songs under the pseudonym William Bowery. The albums garnered widespread critical acclaim. The Guardian and Vox opined that Folklore and Evermore emphasized Swift's work ethic and increased her artistic credibility. Three singles supported each of the albums, catering the U.S. mainstream radio, country radio, and triple A radio. The singles, in that order, were "Cardigan", "Betty", and "Exile" from Folklore, and "Willow", "No Body, No Crime", and "Coney Island" from Evermore. Swift became the first artist to debut a U.S. number-one album and a number-one song at the same time with Folklore's "Cardigan" and Evermore's "Willow". Folklore was 2020's best-selling album in the U.S. with 1.2 million copies. It won Album of the Year at the 63rd Annual Grammy Awards, making Swift the first woman to win the award thrice. At the 2020 American Music Awards, Swift won three awards, including Artist of the Year for a record third consecutive time. She was 2020's highest-paid musician in the U.S., and the world's highest-paid solo musician.

2021–present: re-recordings and Midnights
Following the masters dispute, Swift released two re-recorded albums in 2021, to critical appraisal centering on Swift's vocals. The first, Fearless (Taylor's Version), peaked atop the Billboard 200, becoming the first re-recorded album to do so. It was preceded by the three tracks: "Love Story (Taylor's Version)", "You All Over Me" with Maren Morris, and "Mr. Perfectly Fine", the first of which made Swift the second artist after Dolly Parton to have both the original and the re-recording of a single reach number one on the Hot Country Songs chart. The second re-recording Red (Taylor's Version) was released on November 12. Its final track, "All Too Well (10 Minute Version)"—accompanied by the namesake short film directed by Swift—debuted at number one on the Hot 100, becoming the longest song in history to top the chart. The film received highly positive reviews of Swift's direction. It won the MTV Video Music Award for Video of the Year—Swift's record third win in the category—and the Grammy Award for Best Music Video. Swift was the highest-paid female musician of 2021, and both her 2020 albums and the re-recordings were ranked among the top 10 best-sellers of the year. In May 2021, she was awarded the Brit Global Icon Award, and the National Music Publishers' Association's Songwriter Icon Award. "Wildest Dreams (Taylor's Version)" and "This Love (Taylor's Version)" were released on September 17, 2021 and May 6, 2022, respectively; followed by "All of the Girls You Loved Before", "If This Was a Movie (Taylor's Version)", "Eyes Open (Taylor's Version)", and "Safe & Sound (Taylor's Version)" featuring Joy Williams and John Paul White on March 17, 2023.

Outside her albums, Swift featured on five songs in 2021–2023: "Renegade" and "Birch" by Big Red Machine, a remix of Haim's "Gasoline" and Sheeran's "The Joker and the Queen", and "The Alcott" by the National. She released "Carolina" as part of the soundtrack of the film Where the Crawdads Sing, and played a brief role in the period comedy Amsterdam. A feature film written and directed by Swift for Searchlight Pictures was announced on December 9, 2022.

Swift's tenth studio album, Midnights, was released on October 21, 2022. She experimented with electronica and chill-out music styles on it. Rolling Stone critics dubbed the album an "instant classic". Commercially, Billboard described the album as a blockbuster, and CNBC called it Swift's biggest success yet. Breaking records across all formats of music consumption, Midnights and its lead single, "Anti-Hero", became Spotify's most-streamed album and song in one day with 185million and 17.4million plays, and the US' best-selling album and digital song of 2022, respectively. The album debuted atop the Billboard 200 with 1.57million units and marked Swift's fifth album to open with over one million copies sold. She tied Barbra Streisand for the most number-one albums among women (11), and became the first artist in history to monopolize the Hot 100's entire top 10, with "Anti-Hero", "Lavender Haze", "Maroon", and "Snow on the Beach" featuring Lana Del Rey at the top four. Swift embarked on the Eras Tour in 2023. It broke the record for most concert tickets ever sold in a single day; however, Ticketmaster was widely castigated for its handling of the tour's ticket sales, triggering government investigations into the company.The Eras Tour has just started its first concert date in Glendale, Arizona, to popular acclaim.

Artistry

Influences 
One of Swift's earliest memories of music is listening to her grandmother, Marjorie Finlay, sing in church. As a child, she enjoyed Disney film soundtracks: "My parents noticed that, once I had run out of words, I would just make up my own." Swift said she owes her confidence to her mother, who helped her prepare for class presentations as a child. She also attributes her "fascination with writing and storytelling" to her mother. Swift was drawn to the storytelling aspect of country music, and was introduced to the genre listening to "the great female country artists" of the 1990s—Shania Twain, Faith Hill, and the Dixie Chicks. Twain, both as a songwriter and performer, was her biggest musical influence. Hill was Swift's childhood role model, and she would often imitate her. She admired the Dixie Chicks' defiant attitude and their ability to play their own instruments. Swift also explored the music of older country stars such as Patsy Cline, Loretta Lynn, Tammy Wynette, and Dolly Parton, the last of whom she believes is exemplary to female songwriters, and alt-country artists like Patty Griffin and Lori McKenna. As a songwriter, Swift was influenced by Joni Mitchell, citing especially how Mitchell's autobiographical lyrics convey the deepest emotions; "I think [Blue] is my favorite because it explores somebody's soul so deeply."

Swift has also been influenced by various pop and rock artists. She lists Paul McCartney, Bruce Springsteen, Bryan Adams, the Rolling Stones, Emmylou Harris, Kris Kristofferson, and Carly Simon as her career role models. She likes Springsteen and the Stones for remaining musically relevant for a long time and credits the Stones with being "a huge influence on my entire outlook on my career." As she grows older, Swift aspires to be like Harris and prioritize music over fame. Her synth-pop album 1989 was influenced by some of her favorite 1980s pop acts, including Peter Gabriel, Annie Lennox, Phil Collins, and Madonna. She has also cited Keith Urban's musical style and Fall Out Boy's lyrics as major influences.

Music style 

Swift is known for venturing into various music genres and undergoing artistic reinventions, having been described as a "music chameleon". She self-identified as a country musician until 2012, when she released her fourth studio album, Red. Her albums were promoted to country radio, but music critics noted wide-ranging styles of pop and rock. After 2010, they observed that Swift's melodies are rooted in pop music, and the country music elements are limited to instruments such as banjo, mandolin, and fiddle, and her slight twang; some commented that her country music identity was an indicator of her narrative songwriting rather than musical style. Although the Nashville music industry was receptive of Swift's status as a country musician, critics accused her of abandoning the legitimate roots of country music in favor of crossover success in the mainstream pop market. Red eclectic pop, rock, and electronic styles intensified the critical debate, to which Swift responded, "I leave the genre labeling to other people."

Music journalist Jody Rosen commented that by originating her musical career in Nashville, Swift made a "bait-and-switch maneuver... planting roots in loamy country soil, then pivoting to pop". She abandoned her country-music identity in 2014 with the release of her synth-pop fifth studio album, 1989. Swift described this as her first "documented, official pop album". Her albums Reputation (2017) and Lover (2019) have an upbeat pop production; the former incorporates hip hop and trap elements. Although reviews of Swift's pop albums were generally positive, some critics lamented that the pop music production indicated Swift's pursuit of mainstream success, eroding her authenticity as a songwriter nurtured by her country music background—a criticism that has been retrospectively described as rockist. Musicologist Nate Sloan remarked that Swift's pop music transition was rather motivated by her need to expand her artistry. Swift eschewed mainstream pop in favor of alternative styles like indie rock with her 2020 studio albums, Folklore and Evermore. Clash said her career "has always been one of transcendence and covert boundary-pushing", reaching a point at which "Taylor Swift is just Taylor Swift", not defined by any genre.

Voice
Swift possesses a mezzo-soprano vocal range, and a generally soft but versatile timbre. During her career as a country singer, her vocals were criticized by some as weak and strained compared to those of her contemporaries. Swift admitted her vocal ability often concerned her in her early career, and has worked hard to improve. After transitioning to pop music with 1989, reviews of her vocals remained mixed; critics complained that she lacks proper technique but appreciated her usage of her voice to communicate her feelings to the audience, prioritizing "intimacy over power and nuance". They also praised her for refraining from correcting her pitch with Auto-Tune. Los Angeles Times remarked in 2010 that Swift's defining vocal feature is her attention to detail to convey an exact feeling—"the line that slides down like a contented sigh or up like a raised eyebrow".

Reviews of Swift's later albums were more appreciative of her vocals, finding them less nasal, richer, and more resonant. With Folklore and Evermore, critics complimented her sharp and agile yet translucent and controlled vocals. Pitchfork noted her as a "versatile, expressive vocalist". Music theory professor Alyssa Barna said Swift's timbre is "breathy and bright" in the upper register and "full and dark" in the lower. With her 2021 re-recorded albums, critics began to praise the mature, deeper and "fuller" tone of her voice. An i review said Swift's voice is "leagues better now" with her new-found vocal furniture. The Guardian highlighted "yo-yoing vocal yelps" and passionate climaxes as the trademarks of Swift's voice, and that her country twang has faded away. Midnights received acclaim for her nuanced vocals. She ranked 102nd on the 2023 Rolling Stone list of the 200 Greatest Singers of All Time.

Songwriting 
Swift has been referred to as one of the greatest songwriters of all time and the best of her generation by several publications. She told The New Yorker in 2011 that she identifies as a songwriter first: "I write songs, and my voice is just a way to get those lyrics across." Swift's personal experiences were a common inspiration for her early songs, which helped her navigate life. Her "diaristic" technique began with identifying an emotion, followed by a corresponding melody. On her first three studio albums, love, heartbreak, and insecurities, from an adolescent perspective, were dominant themes. She delved into the tumult of toxic relationships on Red, and embraced nostalgia and post-romance positivity on 1989. Reputation was inspired by the downsides of Swift's fame, and Lover detailed her realization of the "full spectrum of love". Other themes in Swift's music include family dynamics, friendship, alienation, self-awareness, and tackling vitriol, especially sexism.

Her confessional lyrics received positive reviews from critics; they highlighted its vivid details and emotional engagement, which they found uncommon in pop music. Critics praised her melodic songwriting; Rolling Stone described Swift as "a songwriting savant with an intuitive gift for verse-chorus-bridge architecture". NPR remarked that Swift's songs offer emotional engagement because "the wit and clarity of her arrangements turn them from standard fare to heartfelt disclosures". Despite the positive reception, The New Yorker stated she was generally portrayed "more as a skilled technician than as a Dylanesque visionary". Tabloid media often speculated and linked the subjects of her songs with her ex-lovers, a practice reviewers and Swift herself criticized as sexist. Aside from clues in album liner notes, Swift avoided talking about the subjects of her songs.

On her 2020 albums Folklore and Evermore, Swift was inspired by escapism and romanticism to explore fictional narratives. Without referencing her personal life, she imposed emotions onto imagined characters and story arcs, which liberated her from tabloid attention and suggested new paths for her artistry. Swift explained that she welcomed the new songwriting direction after she stopped worrying about commercial success. According to Spin, she explored complex emotions with "precision and devastation" on Evermore. Consequence stated her 2020 albums provided a chance to convince skeptics of Swift had "songwriting power", noting her transformation from "teenage wunderkind to a confident and careful adult".

Swift categorizes her songwriting into three types: "quill lyrics", referring to songs rooted in antiquated poeticism; "fountain pen lyrics", based on modern and vivid storylines; and "glitter gel pen lyrics", which are lively and frivolous. Critics note the fifth track of every Swift album as the most "emotionally vulnerable" song of the album. Swift's bridges are often underscored as one of the best aspects of her songs, earning her the title "Queen of Bridges" from Time. Awarding her with the Songwriter Icon Award in 2021, the National Music Publishers' Association remarked that "no one is more influential when it comes to writing music today" than Swift. The Week deemed her the foremost female songwriter of modern times, and the Nashville Songwriters Association International named her Songwriter-Artist of the Decade in 2022. Carole King considers Swift her "professional grand daughter" and thanked Swift for "carrying the torch forward." Swift has also published two original poems: "Why She Disappeared" and "If You're Anything Like Me".

Video and film 

Swift emphasizes visuals as a key creative component of her music making process. She has collaborated with different directors to produce her music videos, and over time she has become more involved with writing and directing. She developed the concept and treatment for "Mean" in 2011 and co-directed the music video for "Mine" with Roman White the year before. In an interview, White said that Swift "was keenly involved in writing the treatment, casting and wardrobe. And she stayed for both the 15-hour shooting days, even when she wasn't in the scenes."

From 2014 to 2018, Swift collaborated with director Joseph Kahn on eight music videos—four each from her albums 1989 and Reputation. Kahn has praised Swift's involvement in the craft. She worked with American Express for the "Blank Space" music video (which Kahn directed), and served as an executive producer for the interactive app AMEX Unstaged: Taylor Swift Experience, for which she won a Primetime Emmy Award for Outstanding Interactive Program in 2015. Swift produced the music video for "Bad Blood" and won a Grammy Award for Best Music Video in 2016.

Her production house, Taylor Swift Productions, Inc., is credited with producing all of her visual media starting with her 2018 concert documentary Reputation Stadium Tour. She continued to co-direct music videos for the Lover singles "Me!" with Dave Meyers, and "You Need to Calm Down" (also serving as a co-executive producer) and "Lover" with Drew Kirsch, but also ventured into sole direction with the videos for "The Man" (which won her the MTV Video Music Award for Best Direction), "Cardigan", "Willow", "Anti-Hero" and "Bejeweled". After Folklore: The Long Pond Studio Sessions, Swift debuted as a filmmaker with All Too Well: The Short Film, which made her the first artist to win the Grammy Award for Best Music Video as a sole director. Swift has cited Chloé Zhao, Greta Gerwig, Nora Ephron, Guillermo del Toro, John Cassavetes and Noah Baumbach as her filmmaking influences.

Public image 
Swift's music, life and image are points of attention in the global celebrity culture. She became a teen idol with her debut, and has since been a dominant figure in popular culture, often referred to as a pop icon. Several publications note her immense popularity and longevity as the kind of fame unwitnessed since the 20th century. Music critics Sam Sanders and Ann Powers regard Swift as a "surprisingly successful composite of megawatt pop star and bedroom singer-songwriter."

Journalists have written about Swift's polite and "open" personality, calling her a "media darling" and "a reporter's dream". Awarding her for her humanitarian endeavors in 2012, former First Lady Michelle Obama described Swift as an artist who "has rocketed to the top of the music industry but still keeps her feet on the ground, someone who has shattered every expectation of what a 22-year-old can accomplish". Swift was labeled by the media in her early career as "America's Sweetheart" for her likability and girl-next-door image. YouGov surveys ranked her as the world's most admired female musician from 2019 to 2021.

Though Swift is reluctant to publicly discuss her personal life, believing it to be "a career weakness", it is a topic of widespread media attention and tabloid speculation. Clash described Swift as a lightning rod for both praise and criticism. The New York Times asserted in 2013 that her "dating history has begun to stir what feels like the beginning of a backlash" and questioned whether she was in the midst of a "quarter-life crisis". Critics have highlighted the misogyny and slut-shaming to which Swift's life and career have been subject. Glamour opined Swift is an easy target for male derision, triggering "fragile male egos". The Daily Telegraph said her antennae for sexism are crucial for the industry.

Swift is known for her love of cats. Her pet cats have been featured in her visual works, and one of them is the third richest pet animal in the world with an estimated $97 million net worth.

Fashion 

Swift's fashion appeal has been picked up by publications such as People, Elle, Vogue, and Maxim. Her street style has received acclaim. Vogue Australia regards her as an influential figure in sustainable fashion. She co-chaired the 2016 Met Gala. She has reinvented her image and style throughout her career, with each of her album cycles characterized by its own aesthetic and fashion. Consequence opined that Swift's looks evolved from "girl-next-door country act to pop star to woodsy poet over a decade". Swift further popularized Polaroid motifs with 1989, and cottagecore with Folklore and Evermore.

Philanthropy 
Swift is well known for her philanthropic efforts. She was ranked at number one on DoSomething's "Gone Good" list, and has received the "Star of Compassion" accolade from the Tennessee Disaster Services, The Big Help Award from the Nickelodeon Kids' Choice Awards for her "dedication to helping others" as well as "inspiring others through action". In 2008, she donated $100,000 to the Red Cross to help the victims of the Iowa flood. Swift has performed at charity relief events, including Sydney's Sound Relief concert. In response to the May 2010 Tennessee floods, Swift donated $500,000 during a telethon hosted by WSMV. In 2011, Swift used a dress rehearsal of her Speak Now tour as a benefit concert for victims of recent tornadoes in the U.S., raising more than $750,000. In 2016, she donated $1 million to Louisiana flood relief efforts and $100,000 to the Dolly Parton Fire Fund. Swift donated to the Houston Food Bank after Hurricane Harvey struck the city in 2017. In 2020, she donated $1 million for Tennessee tornado relief.

Swift is a supporter of the arts. She is a benefactor of the Nashville Songwriters Hall of Fame. She has donated $75,000 to Nashville's Hendersonville High School to help refurbish the school auditorium, $4 million to fund the building of a new education center at the Country Music Hall of Fame and Museum in Nashville, $60,000 to the music departments of six U.S. colleges, and $100,000 to the Nashville Symphony. Also a promoter of children's literacy, she has donated money and books to various schools around the country to improve education. In 2007, Swift partnered with the Tennessee Association of Chiefs of Police to launch a campaign to protect children from online predators. She has donated items to several charities for auction, including the UNICEF Tap Project and MusiCares. As recipient of the Academy of Country Music's Entertainer of the Year in 2011, Swift donated $25,000 to St. Jude Children's Research Hospital, Tennessee. In 2012, Swift participated in the Stand Up to Cancer telethon, performing the charity single "Ronan", which she wrote in memory of a four-year-old boy who died of neuroblastoma. She has also donated $100,000 to the V Foundation for Cancer Research and $50,000 to the Children's Hospital of Philadelphia. Swift has encouraged young people to volunteer in their local communities as part of Global Youth Service Day.

Swift donated to fellow singer-songwriter Kesha to help with her legal battles against Dr. Luke and to actress Mariska Hargitay's Joyful Heart Foundation organization. After the COVID-19 pandemic began, Swift donated to the World Health Organization and Feeding America and offered one of her signed guitars as part of an auction to raise money for the National Health Service. Swift performed "Soon You'll Get Better" during the One World: Together At Home television special, a benefit concert curated by Lady Gaga for Global Citizen to raise funds for the World Health Organization's COVID-19 Solidarity Response Fund. In 2018 and 2021, Swift donated to the Rape, Abuse & Incest National Network in honor of Sexual Assault Awareness and Prevention Month. In addition to charitable causes, she has made donations to her fans several times for their medical or academic expenses.

Politics and activism
Swift refrained from discussing politics early in her career, fearing it might influence people. Critics took issue with her previously apolitical stance despite her wealth and celebrity. Swift publicly voiced her political opinion for the first time in the 2018 United States elections, when she endorsed Democratic candidates in her home state, Tennessee. In 2019, Swift told The Guardian that when she started her country music career, she was advised against discussing politics by her label executives because of the consequences of the Dixie Chicks controversy, but finally decided to speak up after she became disillusioned with contemporary American politics and moved out of Big Machine.

She identifies as a pro-choice feminist, and is one of the founding signatories of the Time's Up movement against sexual harassment. She criticized the US Supreme Court's decision to overturn Roe v. Wade (1973) and end federal abortion rights in 2022. Swift advocates for LGBT rights, and has called for the passing of the Equality Act, which prohibits discrimination based on sex, sexual orientation, and gender identity. The New York Times wrote her 2011 music video for "Mean" had a positive impact on the LGBTQ+ community. Swift performed during WorldPride NYC 2019 at the Stonewall Inn, frequently deemed the birthplace of the modern gay rights movement. She has donated to the LGBT organizations Tennessee Equality Project and GLAAD.

In August 2020, Swift urged her fans to check their voter registration ahead of elections, which resulted in 65,000 people registering to vote within a day after her post. She endorsed Joe Biden and Kamala Harris in the 2020 U.S. presidential election. Swift supported the March for Our Lives movement and gun control reform, and is a vocal critic of white supremacy, racism, and police brutality in the country. In the wake of the 2020 George Floyd protests, she donated to the NAACP Legal Defense and Educational Fund and the Black Lives Matter movement, called for the removal of Confederate monuments in Tennessee, and advocated for Juneteenth to become a national holiday.

Entrepreneurship 

Media outlets describe Swift as a savvy businesswoman. Inc. dubs her an "incredible flywheel" of social media buzz and virtual word-of-mouth, and The Ringer said she is an omnipresent "musical biosphere unto herself", having achieved the kind of success "that turns a person into an institution, into an inevitability." Swift is also known for her traditional album rollouts, consisting of a variety of promotional activities that Rolling Stone termed as an inescapable "multimedia bonanza".

Easter eggs and cryptic teasers became a common practice in contemporary pop music because of Swift. Publications describe her discography as a music "universe" subject to analyses by fans, critics and journalists, referred to as "Swiftology" in the media. Swift maintains an active presence on social media and a close relationship with fans, to which many journalists attribute her success. Industry commentators note the rising popularity of Swift-themed dance parties in nightclubs worldwide.

Swift has endorsed many brands and businesses. In 2009, she launched a l.e.i. sundress range at Walmart, and designed American Greetings cards and Jakks Pacific dolls. Also that year, she became a spokesperson for the National Hockey League's Nashville Predators and Sony Cyber-shot digital cameras. Swift launched two Elizabeth Arden fragrances—"Wonderstruck" and "Wonderstruck Enchanted", followed by "Taylor" and its variation Made of Starlight in 2013, and "Incredible Things" in 2014. She signed a multi-year deal with television company AT&T in 2016 and bank corporation Capital One in 2019. Swift released a sustainable clothing line with Stella McCartney in 2019. Three years later, in light of her philanthropic support for independent record stores during the COVID-19 pandemic, Record Store Day named Swift their first-ever global ambassador.

Legacy 
As one of the leading music artists of the 21st century, Swift has influenced the music industry in many aspects. Business journalist Greg Jericho describes her as a "cultural vitality". Billboard noted only a few artists have had Swift's chart success, critical acclaim, and fan support, enabling her to have a wide-reaching impact.

Swift helped shape the modern country music scene. Rosen described Swift as the first country act whose fame has reached the world beyond the U.S. Her chart success extends to Asia and the UK, where country music was not previously popular. She is one of the first country acts to use the internet as a marketing tool, promoting her work through MySpace. Following her rise to fame, country labels became interested in signing young singers who write their own music. With her autobiographical songs about romance and heartbreak, Swift introduced the country genre to a younger generation who can relate. Critics have since noted her musical style resonating in albums released by female country singers like Kacey Musgraves, Maren Morris and Kelsea Ballerini. Rolling Stone listed Swift's country music as one of the biggest influences on 2010s pop music, and ranked her 80th in their 100 Greatest Country Artists of All Time list.

Her onstage guitar performances contributed to the "Taylor Swift factor", a phenomenon to which upsurge in guitar sales to women, a previously ignored demographic, is attributed. Pitchfork opined, Swift changed the contemporary music landscape forever with her "unprecedented path from teenage country prodigy to global pop sensation" and a "singularly perceptive" discography that accommodates both musical and cultural shifts. Clash stated Swift's genre-spanning career encouraged her peers to experiment with diverse sounds. Billboard credited her with influencing artists to take creative ownership of their music, as she "has the power to pull any sound she wants into mainstream orbit". Music journalist Nick Catucci wrote, in being personal and vulnerable in her lyrics, Swift helped make space for later pop stars like Billie Eilish, Ariana Grande, and Halsey to do the same. According to The Guardian, Swift leads the rebirth of poptimism in the 21st century with her ambitious artistic vision.

Publications consider Swift's million-selling albums an anomaly in the streaming-dominated industry following the end of the album era in the 2010s. Hence, musicologists Mary Fogarty and Gina Arnold regard her as "the last great rock star". Swift is the only artist in Luminate Data history to have five albums sell over a million copies in a week. To New York magazine, her sales figures prove she is "the one bending the music industry to her will". The Atlantic notes that Swift's "reign" defies the convention that the successful phase of an artist's career rarely lasts more than a few years. She is regarded as a champion of independent record shops, contributing to the 21st-century vinyl revival. Variety dubbed Swift the "Queen of Stream" after she achieved multiple streaming feats as well.

She has influenced numerous mainstream and indie music artists, authors, screenwriters and filmmakers. According to Billboard, Business Insider, and The New York Times, Swift's albums have inspired an entire generation of singers and songwriters. Journalists praise her ability to change industry practices, noting how her actions reformed policies of streaming platforms, prompted awareness of intellectual property among upcoming musicians, and reshaped the concert ticketing model. Various sources deem Swift's music a paradigm representing the millennial generation; Vox called her the "millennial Bruce Springsteen", and The Times named her "the Bob Dylan of our age". She earned the title Woman of the Decade (2010s) from Billboard, Artist of the Decade (2010s) at the American Music Awards, and Global Icon—"in recognition of her immense impact on music across the world"—at the Brit Awards.

Swift is also a subject of academic study; her artistry and fame are popular topics of scholarly media research. Universities such as New York University, Stanford University, and University of Texas at Austin offer courses on Swift in literary, cultural and sociopolitical contexts. Professor Elizabeth Scala dubs Swift a bridge between contemporary and historical fiction. Conservation scientist Jeff Opperman opined in The New York Times that Swift's songs are "filled with the language and images of the natural world", reviving nature in popular culture after a reported decline in nature-themed words. Her songs like "Love Story" are studied by evolutionary psychologists to understand the relationship between popular music and human mating strategies. Economist Alan Krueger devised his concept "rockonomics"—a microeconomic analysis of the music industry—using Swift, whom he considered an "economic genius". In 2022, entomologists named a new millipede species, Nannaria swiftae, in her honor.

Accolades and achievements 

 Swift has won 12 Grammy Awards (including three for Album of the Year—tying for the most by an artist), an Emmy Award, 40 American Music Awards (the most won by an artist), 29 Billboard Music Awards (the most won by a woman), 92 Guinness World Records, 14 MTV Video Music Awards (including three Video of the Year wins—the most by an act), 12 Country Music Association Awards (including the Pinnacle Award), eight Academy of Country Music Awards, and two Brit Awards. As a songwriter, she has been honored by the Nashville Songwriters Association, the Songwriters Hall of Fame, and the National Music Publishers' Association and was the youngest person on Rolling Stone list of the 100 Greatest Songwriters of All Time in 2015. At the 64th BMI Awards in 2016, Swift was the first woman to be honored with an award named after its recipient. In 2023, Swift became the first act to be named the global best-selling artist of the year by the International Federation of the Phonographic Industry (IFPI) thrice.

From available data, Swift has amassed over 50 million album sales, 150 million single sales, and 114 million units in album consumption globally, including 78 billion streams. The International Federation of the Phonographic Industry (IFPI) ranked her as the Global Recording Artist of the Year for a record three times (2014, 2019 and 2022). Swift has the most number-one albums in the United Kingdom and Ireland for a female artist this millennium, and earned the highest income for an artist on Chinese digital music platforms—. Swift is the most streamed female act on Spotify, and the only artist to have received more than 200 million streams in one day (228 million streams on October 21, 2022). The most entries and the most simultaneous entries for an artist on the Billboard Global 200, with 94 and 31 songs, respectively, are among her feats. Her Reputation Stadium Tour (2018) is the highest-grossing North American tour ever, and she was the world's highest-grossing female touring act of the 2010s. Beginning with Fearless, all of her studio albums sold over a million units globally in their opening weeks.

In the US, Swift has sold over 37.3 million albums as of 2019, when Billboard placed her eighth on its Greatest of All Time Artists Chart. Nine of her songs have topped the Billboard Hot 100. She is the longest-reigning act of Billboard Artist 100 (64 weeks), the soloist with the most cumulative weeks (56) atop the Billboard 200, the woman with the most Hot 100 entries (188), top-ten songs (40), and weeks atop the Top Country Albums (98), and the act with the most Digital Songs number-ones (23). Swift is the second highest-certified female digital singles artist (and third overall) in the U.S., with 134 million total units certified by the Recording Industry Association of America (RIAA), and the first woman to have both an album (Fearless) and a song ("Shake It Off") certified Diamond.Swift has appeared in various power listings. Time included her on its annual list of the 100 most influential people in 2010, 2015, and 2019. She was one of the "Silence Breakers" honored as Time Person of the Year in 2017 for speaking up about sexual assault. In 2014, she was named to Forbes 30 Under 30 list in the music category and again in 2017 in its "All-Star Alumni" category. Swift became the youngest woman to be included on Forbes list of the 100 most powerful women in 2015, ranked at number 64. She was the most googled female musician in 2019 and most googled musician overall in 2022. Swift received an honorary Doctor of Fine Arts degree from New York University and served as its commencement speaker on May 18, 2022.

Wealth 
Swift's net worth is $570 million, per a 2022 estimate by Forbes. Additionally, her publication rights over her first six albums are valued at $200 million. Forbes has named her the annual top-earning female musician four times (2016, 2019, 2021, and 2022). She was the highest-paid celebrity of 2016 with $170 million—a feat recognized by the Guinness World Records as the highest annual earnings ever for a female musician, which she herself surpassed with $185 million in 2019. Overall, Swift was the highest paid female artist of the 2010s decade, earning $825 million. She has invested in a real estate portfolio worth $84 million, including the Samuel Goldwyn Estate in Beverly Hills, California; the High Watch in Watch Hill, Rhode Island; and multiple adjacent purchases in Tribeca, Manhattan, nicknamed as "Taybeca" by local realtors.

Discography

Studio albums
 Taylor Swift (2006)
 Fearless (2008)
 Speak Now (2010)
 Red (2012)
 1989 (2014)
 Reputation (2017)
 Lover (2019)
 Folklore (2020)
 Evermore (2020)
 Midnights (2022)

Re-recorded albums
 Fearless (Taylor's Version) (2021)
 Red (Taylor's Version) (2021)

Filmography 

 Valentine's Day (2010)
 Journey to Fearless (2010)
 The Lorax (2012)
 The Giver (2014)
 The 1989 World Tour Live (2015)
 Taylor Swift: Reputation Stadium Tour (2018)
 Cats (2019)
 Miss Americana (2020)
 City of Lover (2020)
 Folklore: The Long Pond Studio Sessions (2020)
 All Too Well: The Short Film (2021)
 Amsterdam (2022)

Tours 

 Fearless Tour (2009–2010)
 Speak Now World Tour (2011–2012)
 The Red Tour (2013–2014)
 The 1989 World Tour (2015)
 Reputation Stadium Tour (2018)
 The Eras Tour (2023)

See also 

 List of best-selling female music artists
 List of Grammy Award winners and nominees by country
 List of highest-certified music artists in the United States
 List of most-followed Instagram accounts
 List of most-followed Twitter accounts
 List of most-subscribed YouTube channels

Footnotes

References

Cited literature

External links

 

 

 
1989 births
Living people
21st-century American actresses
21st-century American guitarists
21st-century American pianists
21st-century American singers
21st-century American women guitarists
21st-century American women pianists
21st-century American women singers
Actresses from Nashville, Tennessee
Alternative rock singers
American acoustic guitarists
American country banjoists
American country guitarists
American country pianists
American country record producers
American country singer-songwriters
American women country singers
American women pop singers
American women rock singers
American women singer-songwriters
American women songwriters
American women record producers
American feminists
American film actresses
American folk guitarists
American folk musicians
American folk singers
American mezzo-sopranos
American multi-instrumentalists
American music video directors
American people of German descent
American people of Italian descent
American people of Scottish descent
American pop guitarists
American pop pianists
American synth-pop musicians
American television actresses
American voice actresses
American women guitarists
Big Machine Records artists
Brit Award winners
Christians from Tennessee
Country musicians from Pennsylvania
Country musicians from Tennessee
Country pop musicians
Emmy Award winners
Female music video directors
Feminist musicians
Film directors from Pennsylvania
Film directors from Tennessee
Grammy Award winners
Guitarists from Pennsylvania
Guitarists from Tennessee
MTV Europe Music Award winners
Musicians from Nashville, Tennessee
NME Awards winners
RCA Records artists
Record producers from Tennessee
Record producers from Pennsylvania
Republic Records artists
Singer-songwriters from Tennessee
Sony Music Publishing artists
Synth-pop singers
Universal Music Group artists
Featured articles
Singer-songwriters from Pennsylvania